The Church of Saint Pius X was a Catholic church located in Todoque, Los Llanos de Aridane, La Palma (Canary Islands, Spain). Built in 1954 and destroyed during the 2021 Cumbre Vieja volcanic eruption, it was the world's first church dedicated to Pope Pius X.

Description

Exterior 
The church, erected after the end of the postwar period by the inhabitants of the town themselves and located on land donated by a neighbor of the area, presented a simple facade framed in the popular Canarian architectural style, although with a clear Mudejar influence.

Built of brick the front wall had a small projection with a shape slightly similar to a trapezoid, while the entrance, in a semicircular arch, was located under a simple-made rose window and a porch with a sloping roof and roof made of Arabic tile supported by four columns with a rectangular base supported on pronounced bases and surmounted by capitals of the Tuscan order. With a gabled roof with prominent buttresses and enclosed windows, to the left of the main facade was the bell tower, with a square plan and two sections with a balcony, a clock and a conical dome with an octagonal base surmounted by a cross. To the left of the entrance door there was a small plaque with the following inscription:

 PRIMER TEMPLO DEL ORBE CATÓLICO
 DEDICADO A LA ADVOCACIÓN DEL
 GRAN PONTÍFICE DE LA EUCARISTIA
 PIO X
 XXX - V - MCMLIV
 TODOQUE 19 - 8 - 84
 (Translation: First church in the Catholic world dedicated to the advocation of the Great Pontiff of the Eucharist, Pius X. 30 May 1954. Todoque, 19 August 1984)

Interior 
The interior, with a rectangular floor plan and a single nave, had a checkered floor and a wooden ceiling. Of great ornamental simplicity, the main chapel, decorated with an altarpiece, had a rectangular floor plan and was located behind a semicircular arch supported by inlaid columns with a square base. The main altarpiece consisted of a body with three streets, a bench and an attic, all made of polychrome and marbled wood. The central niche, with a segmental arch and framed by pilasters, housed a carving of the crucified Christ of great pathos, while the lateral ones, with a semicircular arch and veined, were half the size of the central niche and showed a carving of the Virgin of Carmel on the left and a larger image of Pope Pius X on the right. Between the lateral niches and the attic, friezes stood out which presented, on the left and right respectively, the shields of the Virgin of Carmel and Pius X framed by pilasters as well as the lateral niches and separated from these by simple commiss. The attic, surrounded by fins and pinnacles and crowned by a triangular pediment, showed the pictorial images of God the Father, Jesus and the Holy Spirit in the form of a dove, forming the iconography of the Holy Trinity.

Destruction

On 19 September 2021, an eruption began in the pine forest called Cabeza de Vaca, in the municipality of El Paso, leaving the church that same day within the security perimeter established by the authorities. Sixteen hours later, three lava flows were produced which reached a height of six meters. By 2:00 p.m. on 21 September, the main lava flow had reached the locality of Todoque at a speed of approximately 120 meters per hour. Various elements of the church's furniture were removed, such as images, paintings, liturgical objects and relics. The altarpiece could not be dismantled, and was destroyed along with the benches. After a period of slowdown (four meters per hour), the lava was reactivated reaching an average speed of around 100 meters per hour, passing the Todoque neighborhood and running about 150 meters to the west of the center of the population center. Affected by the lava, at 5:55 p.m. on 26 September, the bell tower of the temple collapsed on itself, an event broadcast live by the BTC Connection program of Radio Televisión Canaria and also recorded by several amateur videographers.

References 

20th-century Roman Catholic church buildings in Spain
Roman Catholic churches in the Canary Islands
Destroyed churches
Former churches in Spain
1954 establishments in Spain
2021 disestablishments in Spain
Buildings and structures completed in 1954
Buildings and structures demolished in 2021